"Jesus is Lord" (Greek: κύριος Ἰησοῦς, kyrios Iesous) is the shortest credal affirmation found in the New Testament, one of several slightly more elaborate variations.  It serves as a statement of faith for the majority of Christians who regard Jesus as both fully man and God.  It is the motto of the World Council of Churches.

Background
In antiquity, in general use, the term "lord" was a courtesy title for social superiors, but its root meaning was "ruler".  Kings everywhere were styled "Lord" and often considered divine beings so the word acquired a religious significance.  When the Hebrew Bible was translated into Greek in the Septuagint at least two centuries before Christianity, Kurios was used for the divine tetragrammaton YHWH which was no longer read aloud but replaced with adonai, a special form of the Hebrew adon = "lord".

When in 27 BC Roman Emperor Octavian received the title of "Augustus" it carried religious overtones, suggesting a special relationship with the world of the gods, symbolised by the cult of the Emperor's "genius", a veiled form of emperor-worship.  To refuse to honor the national gods was unpatriotic and akin to sabotage.

J. G. Davies comments that the Christian begins from the confession of Jesus as Lord – Jesus who is sovereign over the individual's relation to the state, "we must understand the state in the context of the command to love one's neighbour."

Credal phrases in the New Testament

In Pauline Christianity, J. N. D. Kelly points out creed-like slogans attributed to Paul the Apostle in Galatians, 2 Thessalonians, Romans and 1 Corinthians, though they never formed a fixed, standard creed.

In the early days, the similar formula "Jesus is the Christ" was found, but this faded into the background when its original Messianic significance was forgotten. Of more long-term significance was the affirmation "Jesus is the Son of God".

Biblical passages

See also

 Names and titles of Jesus in the New Testament#Lord
 List of Christian creeds

References

Sources

Epistle to Diognetus, 5 quoted in 

New Testament words and phrases
Christology
Christian statements of faith
Religious formulas